Grade 2 is an English band from Ryde on the Isle of Wight. Their music is described as a classic punk sound, and features lyrics about everyday problems. Louder Than War described their album Graveyard Island as "Upbeat stripped back punk’n’roll with a bit of yobbo thrown in.".

History

Formation and early history
The band was formed in May 2013, initially playing covers from the punk era by The Stranglers and The Jam, as well as Oi! music by Booze and Glory and Lion’s Law. They began to write original songs and performed regularly in local pubs and clubs, and gained exposure by successfully supporting established bands.

Contra Records
From November 2013 until 2018 the band was signed to German record label Contra Records.

Hellcat Records
In 2018 Grade 2 signed with US-based Hellcat Records.

Live performance
Since 2013 the band have played regularly across Europe with performances in countries including Germany, Switzerland, Spain, France, the Netherlands, Belgium, Norway, Sweden, Greece, Italy, Ireland, the Czech Republic, Austria, Slovakia, Serbia, the UK, and the Isle of Man. From 2018 the band have also toured in the US and Canada.

During 2016 for some European live dates drummer Jacob Hull was substituted by Ryde drummer Toby Jenkins.

In autumn 2018 Grade 2 was support for The Interrupters UK tour, and in spring 2019 the band toured as support for the Dropkick Murphys.

Discography
 Early demos were recorded in October 2013, 
 A debut EP of original music, "Broken Youth", was released on Contra Records. June 2014
 7" 4-track split with Saints and Sinners "Die With Out Boots On". June 2015
 Grade 2 contributed a track to the ongoing compilation series Oi! This Is Streetpunk Vol.5. May 2015
 The 14-track album 'Mainstream View' was released on CD and vinyl. 16 February 2016.
 7" 4-track EP "Heard it All Before". 15 December 2016
 The album 'Break the Routine' was released in August, 2017.
 The album 'Graveyard Island' was released in 2019 on Hellcat Records.
 The self-titled album 'Grade 2' was released on 17 February 2023 on Hellcat Records.

References

English rock music groups
English punk rock groups
People from Ryde
Musical groups established in 2013
2013 establishments in England
Demons Run Amok Entertainment artists